Telephone numbers in South Ossetia use several trunk codes owned by Russia.

Before the recognition of independence by Russia the country had used Georgian codes:

These codes can still be used when dialling South Ossetian numbers from within Georgia.

References

South Ossetia
South Ossetia